Nahangbagrus songamensis is a species of torrent catfish endemic to Vietnam.  It is the only member of its genus.

References

 

Amblycipitidae
Catfish of Asia
Fish of Vietnam
Endemic fauna of Vietnam
Fish described in 2005